Jefferson Friedman (born 1974 Swampscott, Massachusetts) is an American composer.
He lives in Los Angeles. He received an M.M. degree in music composition from The Juilliard School, where he studied with John Corigliano, and a B.A. from Columbia University, where he studied with David Rakowski and Jonathan Kramer. He also studied with George Tsontakis and Christopher Rouse.

Musical work 
His work has received positive reviews. 
His pieces have been performed throughout the United States and abroad, including at the Kennedy Center for the Performing Arts, Lincoln Center's Alice Tully Hall and Avery Fisher Hall, the Brooklyn Academy of Music, Carnegie Hall's Weill Recital Hall, the Hollywood Bowl, and the American Academy in Rome.

Friedman was commissioned three times by Leonard Slatkin and the National Symphony Orchestra: 
 March, 
 The Throne of the Third Heaven of the Nations Millennium General Assembly 
 Sacred Heart: Explosion

March is a brief closing piece, commissioned by the orchestra as part of the Hechinger Encores series. The Throne and Sacred Heart are the second and third sections of a planned orchestral trilogy entitled In the Realms of the Unreal, each movement of which is based on the life and work of a different American outsider or visionary artist.

The Throne is a musical depiction of Washington outsider artist James Hampton's (1909-1964) sculptural work of the same name.  After its premiere, The Washington Post described the piece as having "ambitious scale and complexity" The piece has subsequently been performed by the New York Philharmonic at Lincoln Center's Avery Fischer Hall, and by the Los Angeles Philharmonic at the Hollywood Bowl.

Sacred Heart: Explosion was commissioned in October 2007, as a revised version of something Friedman wrote while a student at Juilliard.  This is based on the work of visionary artist Henry Darger, of Chicago (1892-1972). 
It was performed by the Chicago Symphony Orchestra in June 2008, 
and included in the 2008 exhibit "Dargerism: Contemporary Artists and Henry Darger" at The American Folk Art Museum in New York

Other works include two string quartets, No. 2 and No. 3, written for the Chiara String Quartet.  
String Quartet No. 2 was published by G. Schirmer, Inc. as part of the New American Voices series, and recorded by The Corigliano Quartet for their Naxos debut CD.

Friedman also composed two pieces for a concert at the Miller Theater in February 2009: a solo piano piece written for Simone Dinnerstein, and a set of songs for rock singer and chamber ensemble, performed by Craig Wedren.

With the exception of String Quartet No. 2, his catalog is self-published by Montana 59 Music.

Recognition and other work 
Friedman received awards for his work at Juilliard, and later received the 2004 Rome Prize Fellowship in Musical Composition, and the Leo Kaplan Award and Morton Gould Award from the ASCAP.

In addition to his composition, Mr. Friedman has performed with a number of rock bands, including Shudder To Think, and the electronic music duo Matmos, contributing string arrangements for their album The Rose Has Teeth in the Mouth of a Beast.

Friedman is the composer of the score for the adult animated sitcom Harley Quinn, as well as the score for the web series Helluva Boss.

In 2012 his String Quartet No. 3 was nominated for the Grammy Award for Best Classical Contemporary Composition.

References

External links
 Personal website

American male composers
21st-century American composers
Living people
Columbia College (New York) alumni
Juilliard School alumni
1974 births
Musicians from Massachusetts
People from Swampscott, Massachusetts
21st-century American male musicians